The 1965–66 Challenge Cup was the 65th staging of rugby league's oldest knockout competition, the Challenge Cup.

The final was contested by St Helens and Wigan at Wembley Stadium in London.

The final was played on Saturday 21 May 1966, where St Helens beat Wigan 21–2 in front of a crowd of 98,536.

The Lance Todd Trophy was awarded to St Helens winger Len Killeen, who also kicked an exceptionally long goal from well inside his own half.

First round

Second round

Quarter-finals

Semi-finals

Final

References

External links
 
 Challenge Cup official website 
 Challenge Cup 1965/66 results at Rugby League Project

Challenge Cup
Challenge Cup